The Qatar men's national volleyball team represents Qatar in international volleyball competitions and friendly matches. As of 20 September 2021, the team was ranked 20th in the world. Qatar's best rank in Asian Championship 4th place, 2015 year.

History
Qatar first appeared at the Asian Volleyball Championship in 1989. Qatar also finished fourth at the 2006 Asian Games which they hosted in Doha, after dropping their semifinal 3-1 to South Korea and the bronze medal match 3-2 to Saudi Arabia. Qatar jointly set the world record for the highest set score in its 45-43 victory over Venezuela on 11 June 2017.

Results

World Championship
 1949 to   2018 – Did not participate or Did not qualify
  2022 – 21st place

World League
 1990 to  2009 – Did not participate
 2010 to  2015 – Did not qualify
 2016 – 31st place
 2017 – 32nd place

Challenger Cup
 2022 – 7th place

Asian Championship
 1975 – Did not participate
 1979 – Did not participate
 1983 – Did not participate
 1987 – Did not participate
 1989 – 19th place
 1991 – Did not participate
 1993 – 12th place
 1995 – 10th place
 1997 – 8th place
 1999 – 13th place
 2001 – 11th place
 2003 – 11th place
 2005 – 7th place
 2007 – 11th place
 2009 – 14th place
 2011 – 12th place
 2013 – 11th place
 2015 – 4th place
 2017 – 9th place
 2019 – 9th place
 2021 – 5th place

Asian Games
 1958 – Did not participate
 1962 – Did not participate
 1966 – Did not participate
 1970 – Did not participate
 1974 – Did not participate
 1978 – Did not participate
 1982 – 8th place
 1986 – Did not participate
 1990 – Did not participate
 1994 – Did not participate
 1998 – 10th place
 2002 – 8th place
 2006 – 4th place
 2010 – 8th place
 2014 – 6th place
 2018 – 4th place

Asian Cup
 2008 – Did not qualify
 2010 – Did not qualify
 2012 – Did not qualify
 2014 – Did not qualify
 2016 – Qualified but later withdrew
 2018 –  Champions
 2022 – Qualified but later withdrew

Current squad
The following is the Qatari roster in the 2022 FIVB Volleyball Men's World Championship.

Head coach:  Camilo Andres Soto

References

Volleyball
National men's volleyball teams
Volleyball in Qatar
Men's sport in Qatar